The 2017–18 Turkish Women's Volleyball League is the 35th edition of the top-flight professional women's volleyball league in Turkey.

League table

Results

Head-to-Head results

Statistic

Results

Week 1 

|}

Week 2 

|}

Week 3 

|}

Week 4 

|}

Week 5 

|}

Week 6 

 
|}

Week 7 

 

|}

Week 8 

|}

Week 9 

|}

Week 10 

|}

Week 11 

|}

Week 12 

|}

Week 13 

 

|}

Week 14 

 

|}

Week 15 

|}

Week 16 

|}

Play-outs

Play-offs
The eight teams that finished in the places 1 to 8 in the Regular season, compete in the Play-off (1-8).

Quarterfinals

|}

Fifth place play-offs
Winners qualify for CEV Challenge Cup main phase.
2 matches were needed for win.

|-

|-
|}

Semifinals
Winners qualify for CEV Champions League league round.

|}

Seventh place matches

|}

Fifth place matches

|}

Third place matches
Winner qualify for CEV Champions League qualification round.
Loser qualify for CEV Cup main phase.

|}

Final matches
5 matches were needed for win.

Final standing

Awards

Regular season

Best Scorer
 Olesia Rykhliuk (Beşiktaş)
Best Setter
  Ezgi Dilik (Eczacıbaşı VitrA)
Best Outside Spikers
  Anne Buijs (Nilüfer Belediyespor)
   Jana Kulan (Kameroğlu Beylikdüzü Vol. İht.)

Best Middle Blockers
  Yasemin Güveli (Eczacıbaşı VitrA)
  Ana Carolina da Silva (Nilüfer Belediyespor)
Best Opposite Spiker
   Tijana Bošković (Eczacıbaşı VitrA)
Best Libero
  Pinar Eren (Beşiktaş)

Finals Series

External links 
 2017–18 Vestel Venus Sultanlar Ligi 

Turkey
Turkish Volleyball League
Turkish Volleyball League
2017 in Turkish women's sport
2018 in Turkish women's sport
Turkish Women's Volleyball League seasons